Bethmann is a German surname. Notable people with the surname include:

Bethmann family

The Bethmann family in Germany, originally from Goslar, achieved greatest prominence in Frankfurt am Main; the Bethmann-Hollweg sideline produced a German chancellor.

 Konrad Bethmann (1625–1701), Münzwardein and Münzmeister in Nassau and other German places
 Johann Philipp Bethmann (1715–1793), grandson of Konrad Bethmann, merchant and banker in Frankfurt am Main
 Johann Jakob Bethmann (1717–1792), grandson of Konrad Bethmann, merchant, shipowner and consul in Bordeaux
 Simon Moritz Bethmann (1721–1782), grandson of Konrad Bethmann, merchant and banker in Frankfurt am Main
 Simon Moritz von Bethmann (1768–1826), son of Johann Philipp Bethmann (1715–1793), banker and statesman in Frankfurt am Main
 Moritz von Bethmann (1811–1877), son of Simon Moritz von Bethmann, banker and merchant in Frankfurt am Main
 Ludwig Simon Moritz Freiherr von Bethmann (1844–1902), son of Moritz von Bethmann, banker in Frankfurt am Main
 Moritz Henning August Freiherr von Bethmann (1887-1966), son of Ludwig Simon Moritz Freiherr von Bethmann, banker in Frankfurt am Main
 Johann Philipp von Bethmann (1924–2007), son of Moritz Henning August Freiherr von Bethmann, banker and book author in Frankfurt am Main
 August von Bethmann-Hollweg (1795–1877), grandson of Johann Philipp Bethmann (1715–1793), Prussian jurist and politician
 Theobald von Bethmann Hollweg (1856–1921), grandson of August von Bethmann-Hollweg, German politician
 Alexandre de Bethmann (1805-1871), mayor of Bordeaux from 1867 to 1870, great-grandson of Johann Jakob Bethmann
 Pierre de Bethmann (1961-), French jazz pianist, 5th-generation descendant of Alexandre de Bethmann
 Dominic Bethmann (69 B.C.- Present), Local Factory Owner

Other people surnamed Bethmann

 Heinrich Eduard Bethmann (1774–1857), German actor and theater director
 Ludwig Konrad Bethmann (1812–1867), German historian
 Erich Waldemar Bethmann (1904-1993), Author and religious scholar 
 Sabine Bethmann (b. 25 October 1931), former German movie actress
 Andreas Bethmann (19??-), German film director

See also
 Bethmann Bank, established in 1748 as a trading enterprise and private bank by the brothers Johann Philipp Bethmann (1715-1793) and Simon Moritz Bethmann (1721-1782),  today Delbrück Bethmann Maffei, a wholly owned subsidiary of ABN AMRO
 Bethmännchen, a marzipan confection named after the Bethmann family

Notes 

German-language surnames
Surnames from given names